

The , formally known as the  is a museum about Japanese currency located in front of the Bank of Japan building in Chūō, Tokyo.

The museum opened in November 1985. In 2010, there was an exhibition of wallets from the Edo Period (1603–1867) and Meiji Era (1868–1912).

Gallery

See also

 Japanese currency
 List of museums in Tokyo

References

External links
 Official website 
 Official website 

Buildings and structures in Chūō, Tokyo
Museums established in 1985
Museums in Tokyo
Bank museums
Numismatic museums in Asia
Bank of Japan
1985 establishments in Japan